Karl-Erik Bergsten (1909–1990) was a Swedish geographer. When professor Fredrik Enquist retired in 1952 Bergsten assumed his chair as geography professor in Göteborg University. Bergsten held that position until 1958 when he moved to the University of Lund being succeeded by Sten Rudberg in Göteborg.

References

1909 births
1990 deaths
Swedish geographers
20th-century Swedish geologists
Quaternary geologists
Lund University alumni
Academic staff of the University of Gothenburg
Academic staff of Lund University
20th-century geographers